, nicknamed  by his fans, is a Japanese pop singer-songwriter. He has sold a total of 21 million copies in Japan alone.

Biography 
Makihara was born on 18 May 1969 in Takatsuki, Osaka, Japan. He attended Aoyama Gakuin University to study English literature. In addition to creating songs for his own music career, he has written, produced and performed songs for many other artists, the most notable being SMAP's Sekai ni Hitotsu Dake no Hana. He is ranked at No.84, in a list of Japan's top 100 musicians, provided by HMV.He was also invited to write the song "The Gift" for English band blue in their album "Guilty".

Makihara made his debut to the J-Pop scene in the early '90s after performing on a televised song competition program. He made a name for himself with the release of songs such as "Mou Koi Nante Shinai" and "Donna Toki mo.", both of which, among several others, are covered to this day by current popular artists (including English-language covers by various American artists). Some of his music has been translated into other languages, and "Donna Toki mo", specifically has been remixed by Bemani artists "Dream Line Out" for use on Konami's Beatmania game series.

Much of his music's lyrical content has revolved around the subject of romantic love, though themes of profound joy, reminiscence, gratitude and deeper spiritual aspects of the human condition have become predominant in recent years.

In 1999, he was given a suspended 18-months prison sentence for possession of amphetamines.

In 2003 he became famous for composing " Sekai ni Hitotsu Dake no Hana"" (世界に一つだけの花, "The One and Only Flower in the World") which was recorded by Japanese boy band SMAP and sold double millions

On 13 February 2020, Makihara was arrested for alleged illegal stimulant possession, as police found 0.083 gram of stimulant at his condominium in Tokyo's Minato Ward in April 2018.

On 2 August 2020, Makihara was sentenced to 2 years in prison, suspended for 3 years by the Tokyo District Court.

Discography

Singles

Albums
'Kimi ga Warau Toki, Kimi no Mune ga Itamanai Youni' (25 October 1990, WEA Japan. Re-released 26 November 1998)
'Shuushoku Sensen Ijou Nashi' (25 June 1991)
'Kimi wa Dare to Shiawase na Akubi wo Shimasu ka.' (25 September 1991, WEA Japan. Re-released 26 November 1998)
'Kimi wa Boku no Takaramono' (25 June 1992, WEA Japan.Re-released 26 November 1998)
'SELF PORTRAIT' (31 October 1993, WEA Japan)
'PHARMACY' (25 October 1994, WEA Japan)
'Ver.1.0E LOVE LETTER FROM THE DIGITAL COWBOY' (25 July 1996, WEA Japan/River Way)
'LOVE CALLS FROM THE DIGITAL COWGIRL' (10 August 1996, WEA Japan/River Way)
'UNDERWEAR' (25 October 1996, WEA Japan/River Way)
'SMILING~THE BEST OF NORIYUKI MAKIHARA~' (10 May 1997, WEA Japan)
'SMILING II~THE BEST OF NORIYUKI MAKIHARA~' (25 September 1997, WEA Japan)
'Such a Lovely Place' (27 November 1997, SME Records)
'SMILING III~THE BEST OF NORIYUKI MAKIHARA~' (10 May 1998, WEA Japan)
'Listen to the Music' (28 October 1998, SME Records)
'SMILING GOLD~THE BEST & BACKING TRACKS~' (24 February 1999, WEA Japan)
'Cicada' (10 July 1999, SME Records)
'10 Y. O. ~THE ANNIVERSARY COLLECTION~' (24 May 2000)
'Taiyou' (29 November 2000, WEA Japan)
'NORIYUKI MAKIHARA SINGLE COLLECTION~Such a Lovely Place 1997–1999~' (6 December 2000)
'Home Sweet Home' (21 November 2001, WEA Japan)
'Song Book~Since 1997–2001~' (23 January 2002)
'THE CONCERT – CONCERT TOUR 2002 "Home Sweet Home" – ' (9 May 2002)
'Honjitsu wa Seiten Nari' (7 November 2002, WEA Japan)
'EXPLORER' (11 August 2004, Toshiba-EMI)
'Completely Recorded' (25 August 2004, WEA Japan)
'NORIYUKI MAKIHARA SYMPHONY ORCHESTRA "CELEBRATION"' (25 November 2004)
'Listen To The Music 2' (28 September 2005, Toshiba-EMI)
'LIFE IN DOWNTOWN' (22 February 2006, Toshiba-EMI)
'Kanashimi Nante Nan no Yaku ni mo Tatanai to Omotteita.' (7 November 2007, J-More)
'Personal Soundtracks' (19 November 2008, J-More)
'Best LOVE' (1 January 2010, J-More)
'Best LIFE' (1 January 2010, J-More)
'Fuan no Naka ni Te o Tsukkonde' (30 June 2010, J-More)
'Heart to Heart' (27 July 2011, Buppu/SME Records)
'Dawn Over the Clover Field' (19 December 2012, Buppu/SME Records)
'Listen To The Music 3' (22 January 2014, Buppu/SME Records)
'Lovable People' (11 February 2015, Buppu/SME Records)
'Believer' (14 December 2016, Buppu/SME Records)
'Design & Reason' (13 February 2019, Buppu/SME Records)
'Yosoro' (25 October 2021, Buppu/SME Records)
'Bespoke' (2 March 2022, Buppu/SME Records)

See also 
 List of best-selling music artists in Japan

References

External links
 
 Buppu Records Website
  by Avex Group
 Noriyuki Makihara on Avex Group
 Noriyuki Makihara on EMI Music Japan
 Noriyuki Makihara on Warner Music Japan
 Noriyuki Makihara on Sony Music Japan

1969 births
Living people
Japanese male pop singers
Japanese male singer-songwriters
Japanese singer-songwriters
Japanese LGBT musicians
Musicians from Osaka Prefecture
People from Takatsuki, Osaka
Aoyama Gakuin University alumni
Sony Music Entertainment Japan artists
Avex Group artists
Japanese people convicted of drug offenses